Amity International Schools is a 5-Pvt. Unaided (Recognized) 3-Co-educational  are schools located in New Delhi, India, National Capital Region (NCR Delhi), and Lucknow. These schools are affiliated to the Central Board of Secondary Education (CBSE), Delhi. They were founded by Ashok Chauhan.
Amity International School, Saket is the first in the chain of schools and institutions established under the aegis of Chauhan in 1991.

Achievements
A small team of students from Amity International Schools won the 20th Annual International Space Settlement Design Competition, 2015, that was held at NASA's Kennedy Space Center in Florida, United States.

Some students from Amity International school,Noida won a STEM competition named f1 in schools.

See also
 Amity International School, Gurgaon
 Amity International School Vasundhara
 Amity International School, Amsterdam

References

External links 
 

Schools in Noida
International schools in Delhi
1991 establishments in India
Educational institutions established in 1991